This is a list of events from British radio in 1941.

Events
 14 January – In a BBC radio broadcast from London, Victor de Laveleye asks all Belgians to use the "V sign" as a rallying sign, being the first letter of victoire (victory) in French and of vrijheid (freedom) in Dutch, the beginning of a subversive campaign which spreads across occupied Europe.
 February – BBC begins construction of an emergency broadcasting facility in the disused tunnel of the Clifton Rocks Railway in Bristol.
 May – Arthur Bliss joins the BBC's overseas music service. 
 6 August – C. S. Lewis begins a series of BBC radio broadcasts that will be adapted as Mere Christianity.
 30 December – The Brains Trust first broadcast as Any Questions?  on the BBC Home Service.

Debuts
 Sincerely Yours, presented by Vera Lynn (BBC)

Continuing radio programmes

1930s
 In Town Tonight (1933–1960)

1940s
 Music While You Work (1940–1967)
 Sunday Half Hour (1940–2018)

Births
 January – John Rowe, actor
 24 March – Humphrey Barclay, comedy producer
 10 May – Chris Denning, presenter and sex offender 
 20 July – Ed Doolan, Australian-born presenter (died 2018)
 28 July – Peter Marinker, voice actor
 4 August – Martin Jarvis, voice and stage actor
 30 August – Sue MacGregor, presenter
 5 December – Sheridan Morley, theatrical critic/biographer and broadcaster (died 2007)
 Christopher Lee, BBC News correspondent, historian and radio documentary writer (died 2021)

See also 
 1941 in British music
 1941 in British television
 1941 in the United Kingdom
 List of British films of 1941

References 

 
Years in British radio
Radio